Connie Skov Hyde (born 15 November 1969) is an English actress.

Hyde was born to an English father and Danish mother. She grew up in Haslingden in Rossendale, Lancashire.

She is best known for playing PC Cathy Bradford in The Bill from 2002 to 2004, DC Janet Miller in City Central, Catherine Heywood in Wing and a Prayer. She has also been in Casualty, Doctors, Holby City, Dalziel and Pascoe, The Vicar of Dibley, Sharpe, Waterloo Road and the 1999 TV film The Dark Room from the novel by Minette Walters. She also appeared in a BBC Wales series, Lifeboat.

On 15 March 2017, it was announced that she had joined the cast of Coronation Street as Sally Webster's (Sally Dynevor) sister Gina Seddon, taking over the role from Julie Foy. It was announced in March 2019 that Hyde would leave Coronation Street. She made her final appearance on 1 April 2019.

In 2020, Hyde shared her memories of The Bill, Coronation Street, her life and career in a special interview for The Bill Podcast.

References

External links

 The Bill Podcast

1970 births
English television actresses
English soap opera actresses
English people of Danish descent
Living people
People from Haslingden
People from Macclesfield
Actresses from Lancashire
Actresses from Cheshire